A perceptual paradox illustrates the failure of a theoretical prediction.  Theories of perception are supposed to help a researcher predict what will be perceived when senses are stimulated.

A theory usually comprises a mathematical model (formula),
rules for collecting physical measurements for input into the model,
and rules for collecting physical measurements to which model outputs should map.  When arbitrarily choosing valid input data, the model should reliably generate output data that is indistinguishable from that which is measured in the system being modeled.

Although each theory may be useful for some limited predictions,
theories of vision, hearing, touch, smell, and taste are not typically
reliable for comprehensive modeling of perception based on sensory inputs.  A paradox illustrates where a theoretical prediction fails.
Sometimes, even in the absence of a predictive theory,
the characteristics of perception seem nonsensical.

This page lists some paradoxes and seemingly impossible properties of perception.  When an animal is not named in connection with the discussion, human perception should be assumed since
the majority of perceptual research data applies to humans.

Terminology 

 light Normal white sunlight is black-body radiation containing a broad and largely featureless spectrum covering the entire range of human vision.
 light Televisions and computer screens fool the eye by generating photons of three narrow wavelength bands where the proportion of photons from industry standard (but improperly named) R (red), G (green), and B (blue) sources is known to be perceived as white.

Definition 

A perceptual paradox, in its purest form is a statement
illustrating the failure of a formula to predict
what we perceive from what our senses transduce.

A seemingly nonsensical characteristic is a statement of factual observation
that is sufficiently intractable that no theory has been proposed to account for it.

Mathematical modeling 

One branch of research into perception attempts to explain
what we perceive by applying formulae to sensory inputs
and expecting outputs similar to that which we perceive.
For example: what we measure with our eyes should be predicted
by applying formulae to what we measure with instruments that imitate our eye.

Past researchers have made formulae that predict
some, but not all, perceptual phenomena from their sensory origins.
Modern researchers continue to make formulae to overcome
the shortcomings of earlier formulae.

Some formulae are carefully constructed to mimic
actual structures and functions of sensory mechanisms.
Other formulae are constructed by great leaps of faith
about similarity in mathematical curves.

No perceptual formulae have been raised to the status of "natural law"
in the way that the laws of gravitation and electrical attraction have.
So, perceptual formulae continue to be an active area of development
as scientists strive towards the great insight required of a law.

History 

Some Nobel laureates have paved the way with clear statements of good practice:

In the preface to his Histology

Santiago Ramón y Cajal
wrote that "Practitioners will only be able to claim that a valid explanation of a histological observation has been provided if three questions can be answered satisfactorily: what is the functional role of the arrangement in the animal; what mechanisms underlie this function; and what sequence of chemical and mechanical events during evolution and development gave rise to these mechanisms?"

Allvar Gullstrand described the problems that arise
when approaching the optics of the eye as if they were as predictable as camera optics.

Charles Scott Sherrington, considered the brain to be
the "crowning achievement of the reflex system",
(which can be interpreted as opening all aspects of perception to simple formulae
expressed over complex distributions).

Sensory Observations 
 See:Visual
 Hear:Auditory
 Touch:Tactile
 Smell:Olfactory
 Taste:Gustatory
 Electric

Perceptual Observations 
 See:Visual
 Hear:Auditory
 Touch:Tactile
 Smell:Olfactory
 Taste:Gustatory
 Electric

Statements of Paradox

See:Visual 
Contrast Invariance
Boundaries between brighter and darker areas
appear to remain of constant relative contrast
when the ratio of logarithms of the two intensities
remains constant:

 

But the use of logarithms is forbidden
and division is forbidden

No published neuroanatomical model predicts the perception
of contrast invariance.

10 Decade Transduction

Local Contrast

Color Constancy
When observing objects in a scene, colors appears constant.
An apple looks red regardless of where it is viewed.
In bright direct sunshine, under a blue sky with the sun obscured,
during a colorful sunset, under a canopy of green leaves,
and even under most man-made light sources,
the color of the apple remains unchanging.

Color perception appears to be independent of light wavelength.
Edwin Land demonstrated this by illuminating a room with
two wavelengths of light of approximately 500 nm and 520 nm
(both improperly called "green").
The room was perceived in full color,
with all colors appearing unattenuated,
like red, orange, yellow, blue, and purple,
despite the absence of photons other than two close to 510 nm.
Note that  light misuses the terminology RGB
since color is a perception and
there are no such things as Red, Green, or Blue photons.

Jerome Lettvin wrote an article in the Scientific American

illustrating the importance of boundaries and vertices
in the perception of color.

Yet, no published formula predicts the perceived color of objects
in a single image of arbitrary scene illumination.

Transverse Chromatic Deaberration
Light that goes through a simple lens such as found in an eye
undergoes refraction, splitting colors.
An  point-source that is off-center to the eye
projects to a pattern where with color separation along a line radial to
the central axis of the eye.
The color separation can be many photoreceptors wide.

Yet, an  pixel on a television or computer screen appears white
even when seen sidelong.

No published neuroanatomical model predicts the perception of
the eccentric white pixel.

Longitudinal Chromatic Deaberration
As in Transverse Chromatic Deaberration,
color splitting projects also projects the R, G, and B components
of the  pixel to different focal lengths,
resulting in a bulls-eye-like color distribution of light
even at the center of vision.

No published neuroanatomical model predicts the perception of
the centered white pixel.

Spherical Deaberration
Eyes have corneas and lenses that are imperfectly spherical.
This inhomogeneous shape results in a non-circular distribution of photons on the retina.

No published neuroanatomical model predicts the perception of
the non-circularly distributed white pixel.

Hyperacuity
People report discrimination much finer than can be predicted
by interpolating sense data between photosensors.
High performing hyperacute vision in some people
has been measured to less than a tenth the radius of a single photoreceptor.
Among measures of hyperacuity are the vernier discrimination of two adjacent lines
and the discrimination of two stars in a night sky.

No published neuroanatomical model predicts the discrimination of
the two white pixels closer together than a single photoreceptor.

Pupil Size Inversion
When pupils are narrowed to around 1mm for reading fine print,
the size of the central "Airy" disk increases to a diameter of 10 photoreceptors.
The so-called "blur" is increased for reading.
When pupils are widened for fight/flight response,
the size of the central "Airy" disk decreases to a diameter of about 1.5 photoreceptors.
The so-called "blur" is decreased in anticipation of large movements.

No published neuroanatomical model predicts that discrimination
improves when pupils are narrowed.

Pupil Shape Inversion
Eyes have pupils (apertures) that cause diffraction.
A point-source of light is distributed on the retina.
The distribution for a perfectly circular aperture
is known by the name "Airy rings".

Human pupils are rarely perfectly circular.
Cat pupils range from almost circular to a vertical slit.
Goat pupils tend to be horizontal rectangular with rounded corners.
Gecko pupils range from circular, to a slit, to a series of pinholes.
Cuttlefish pupils have complex shapes.

No published neuroanatomical model predicts the perception of
the various pupil shape distributed white pixel.

Hear:Auditory

Touch:Tactile

Smell:Olfactory 

One paradoxical perception concerning the sense of smell is the theory of one's own ability to smell. Smell is intrinsic to being alive, and is even shown to be a matter of genetics.

Taste:Gustatory

Electric

Conclusion

References 

Perception
Paradoxes